Australian Standard AS3959:2018 Construction of buildings in bushfire-prone areas is an Australian standard for construction of buildings in bushfire-prone zones.

The 2009 release of AS3959 (AS3959:2009), which took into account findings of the Black Saturday bushfires, had significant changes from earlier versions, bringing major changes to construction of homes to be built in the future. Under this standard all proposed building requires the builder or landowner to undertake a BAL (Bushfire Attack Level) Assessment. This requires a report tabled to establish the threat of bushfire on this future proposed dwelling. The report takes in matters such as the area FDI (Fire Danger Index), the block's ground slope, vegetation type and density to determine the intensity of fire attack, split into 6 levels. The six levels relate to the intensity of radiant heat exposure, with the levels being BAL-LOW (no threat or construction changes needed), BAL-12.5 (Radiant Heat levels would calculate 12.5 kW/m2), BAL-19 (19 kW/m2), BAL-29 (29 kW/m2), BAL-40 (40 kW/m2) and BAL-FZ (Flame Zone, which can be as high as 100 kW/m2). AS3959:2009 therefore instructed what changes and test methods are required for construction to comply to the BAL Assessed levels. AS3959:2009 was adopted as part of the BCA (Building Code Of Australia) from 1 May, 2010.

The standard was updated in 2018, with this issue called AS3959:2018.

Copies of Australian standards such as AS3959:2018 are available from SAI Global.

References

https://web.archive.org/web/20100922210205/http://www.rfs.nsw.gov.au/file_system/attachments/State/Attachment_20071220_F5C26EE1.pdf
https://web.archive.org/web/20101220144131/http://timber.org.au/Resources/%7B192276D8-3539-4F02-8DEE-011377A45272%7D_WS%20Addendum.pdf
http://infostore.saiglobal.com/store/Details.aspx?ProductID=1101539

Standards of Australia
Fire protection
Construction industry of Australia